Khamoshi is a Pakistani romantic drama television series aired on Hum TV during 2017–2018. It is produced by Momina Duraid under their banner MD Productions. It stars Zara Noor Abbas, Bilal Khan, Iqra Aziz and Affan Waheed. It received critical acclaim and was one of the most watched Pakistani series of 2017.

Plot summary
The series follows the story of Arsala, played by Zara Noor Abbas who is a middle-class girl and wants to do something for her family, despite knowing the fact that her greedy father and envious sister consider Arsala as a misfortune. It also focuses on changing relationships and love triangles between Arsala, Atif, Shahram and Naeema.

Synopsis 
The serial revolves around two sisters, Arsala (Zara Noor Abbas) and Naeema (Iqra Aziz), who are completely different from each other. The elder, Arsala is simple and trusting girl while the younger, Naeema is greedy and miser, Who is jealous of Arsala. Their brother Guddu (Fazal Husain) is also very simple and supports and respects Arsala. Arsala is engaged to Atif (Affan Waheed) and Naeema also likes him, so she strives to separate them. Their father Sabir (Tauqeer Nasir) works in factory but doesn't get enough salary. Sabir catches Atif and Arsala talking alone at his home, to which he breaks their engagement and sends Arsala to his relative Mudasir (Javaid Iqbal)'s home as maid who gives her Rs. 30, 000/- monthly. Haseena (Ambar Wajid) is a Muddasdir's wife. Haseena's attitude towards Arsala is not so good, she always teases Arsala. A best friend of Haseena, (Rashida Tabassum) requests her to give Arsala to her as maid after she leaves their job as maid and she will give her fees double to what she gives her. Haseena agrees to it as both had to go to Canada for Haseena's treatment.

Arsala comes to her home, as she thinks her parents will keep her, but she sees both, Naeema and Atif marrying. On morning, Atif says Arsala that he hates her because she kicked off their love. Atif goes to office without meeting Arsala, to which Naeema acts harsh and warns Arsala to go from home. While Arsala, without any choice leaves the home and goes to work in (Rashida Tabassum)'s home where her employer Jamal (Saifee Hasan) gets attracted to her. He harassed her but she doesn't tell to mistress. One day, her mistress finds them both in kitchen where Jamaal was harassing Arsala. She then requests Arsala to leave, as she will be tortured by Jamaal again. Arsala leaves the home with silence and goes to Haseena's home, who has their flight to Canada after three hours. She requested Haseena to get her to any house out institution, where she could get money. After multiple requests, Haseena agrees to her statement, and gets her to Bi Jaan (Azra Mansoor)'s home. Bi Jaan lives with a son Basit (Mohsin Geelani), daughter-in-law Nasreen (Mariam Mirza), granddaughter Zubiya (Zahra Shah) and grandson, Shahram (Bilal Khan). Bi Jaan reveals to Arsala her grandson Shahram. Shahram falls madly in love with Arsala. He helps Arsala's family for Naeema's marriage by sending 5 lakh rupees to her family  by using Bi Jaan's name. He sees Arsala crying twice which leaves him in curiosity. He asks Bi Jaan about Arsala and he learns about Arsala's past which leaves him in complete shock. Meanwhile, preparations as well as functions had started in Sabir house for Naeema's marriage. 
                                                                                                                                                    
Shahram arrives at Sabir house and meets Sabir a day before Nikah. He pleases Sabir by saying that he will grant all of Sabir's wishes if he marries Arsala to Atif. Sabir talks to Atif and his family and convinces Atif. He does it all in the greed of money. When Naeema learns of this, she creates a big scene to which her mother also supports her and both of them blame Arsala that she has changed everyone with her money but Arsala refuses and tells Atif to marry Naeema. Later, her abba informs her that Shahram was behind all of this and he also paid a big amount to her father. She leaves for Karachi, but her father tells Shahram about all of this and he reaches the bus station where Arsala is waiting for the bus. They are about to leave together when they are confronted by Atif. he tries to stop Arsala, but Arsala rejects him and seeing Arsala with another rich man (Shahram), Atif gets furious and tells Arsala to leave and never come back, because she is greedy and he hates her. Heartbroken, Arsala leaves with Shahram. After Arsala had left, Atif marries Naeema.

On their way back to Karachi, Shahram tries to explain himself, but Arsala is very angry with him and says that he has no right to interfere in her life. She tells Shahram that now she does not have any place for Atif in her life. When they both reach Karachi, at Bijaan's house, Zubiya and Nasreen are frustrated when they learns that Arsala came to Karachi with Shahram and warns Arsala to not get any expectations from Shahram. On the other hand, Shahram is relaxed and happy and, on being advised by his assistant Safdar to do what he wants, he goes to Bi Jaan where he meets Nasreen and Zubiya. He tells them that he is there because he is really happy and he wants to talk to Bi Jaan about something special. Nasreen and Zubiya think he might ask for Zubiya's proposal, but when Bi Jaan arrives, he asks for Arsala's hand in marriage. All of them are in shock, but Shahram remains determined to marry Arsala.

Everyone gets angry at Bi Jaan and asks Arsala to leave their house. Even suggest and scold Bi Jaan not to support and encourage Arsala. Arsala leaves Bi Jaan's home and starts looking for a new shelter. She comes across a women's welfare institution where women and girls learn stitching suits and costumes and does small amount of Business. Arsala requests the Social Worker [(Tahseen)]  to let her work and provide her shelter. Social worker [(Tahseen)] shows mercy and takes to her home. She allows her to work until the trainer comes back. She works there and stays with Owner in  her home.

On the other side, Sha learns about Arsala and searches for her. He comes across the welfare association owner and they have long known each other. He requests her to take care of Arsala and supports the business indirectly for the welfare of Arsala.

Later he meets Arsala and Arsala requests him to make him speak with Bi Jaan. 
Shahram makes a vacation plan to Dubai and requests Zubiya and family to visit for a month.

Meanwhile, he plans to take Bi Jaan to his home and would bring Arsala. Bi Jaan and Arsala stay together for a while.
Atif learns that whatever dowry and money received by him, was by Arsala's earnings. He asks Naeema to give her parents back the money but she makes a fuss. On the other hand, Arsala and Shahram are engaged (according to their plan) but Zubiya and her family finds out and they fight wit Bi Jaan about it. Shahram confesses Arsala about his love. Zubiya's mother tell lies about Arsala to his father and he had a heart attack. He dies making the last wish to Arsala to marry Shahram. Meanwhile, on the funeral, Naeema abuses Arsala about Shahram and Shahram listens to it. Arsala leaves the house early with Shahram. In the car, She was going to accept his love, but he breaks the engagement. Inside the house, she cries and Shahram listens to it. On the other hand, Basit leaves Bi Jaan to old home and Shahram accepts Zubiya. Atif comes to Karachi only to find out he works for Arsala. after Arsala realizes that it is Atif coming for the job, she declines, but because he feels bad, Shahram hires him without revealing to Atif he is working for him, and Atif receives a house and a good paying job as a result of Shahram. Shahram and Zubiya get engaged, whilst Bi Jaan is sick in the old home and her son is refusing to pick up the phone calls concerning her. Atif and his wife are called to the engagement, and so it Arsala, and all of them attend. while at the engagement, Atif and Naeema see Arsala, and although Naeema resents it, Atif is pleased to see her. Shahram takes Zubiya and her mother aside, along with Naeema, Atif and Arsala, where he says he will break off the engagement with Zubiya unless her mother apologizes for mistreating Arsala and clearing up all the lies she had told about what she did in Karachi. After, Arsala forgives them, and Atif approaches Arsala asking her why she was quiet. She says they are not family for her because they left her. Arsala, while leaving, comes across a man who inform's Basit about Bi Jaan's critical condition, and she flees to the hospital. Shes sees Bi Jaan, and cries because of her state. She calls Shahram, but by the time he arrives, she is already dead. the body is taken to Shahrams house, and accordance to Bi Jaans will, where she said she will not be taken to her sons house because of what he did. Shahram tells them this after Basit comes demanding the body, and he breaks off all ties with them, which includes his engagement with Zubiya.

After reading his mother's will, Basit it overcome with guilt with what he did. Zubiya is heartbroken due to her engagement break, and Shahram and Arsala are mourning the death of Bi Jaan. Atif, after reflecting on what Arsala has said to him multiple times, goes to Naeema and tells her to leave with her mother, who wanted to return home. He says that he didn't love Arsala, and Naeema doesn't love him either. They just love themselves, and think they can get what they want.

Nasreen says to Basit that the old woman had died but didn't let us being happy. Basit slaps her and says I should havr slapped you earlier so my mother would be here with me. Arsala's mother apologise to her and she forgives her. Naeema says to Arsala that she snatched Atif from her but Arsala says that you are responsible for all this. Arsala confronts Atif and ask him not to leave Naeema. Atif says she should feel that what she has done to other's life and that he is going abroad and leaving his job. Arsala ask him to take her Khala (Atif's mother) with her, upon which he agrees. Guddu taunts Naeema so much. Naeema's conscience says that she is responsible for all this. She has lost everything and she commits suicide by jumping from the terrace. Tahseen tells to Shahram who is  leaving for Canada later that night, that he has done so much for Arsala. Tahseen  arranges a dinner for them without letting each other know. Arsala stop Shahram from going and Shahram puts ring in her hand and both walk with hand in hand.

Cast 
 Zara Noor Abbas as Arsla:
 A simple and beautiful girl, who is in love of Atif but sacrifices her love due to family circumstances. She does anything to make her family happy. Sabir takes advantage of her doing job and leaves the factory job. She has a greedy sister, Naeema and a trusting brother, Guddu. She is the daughter of Sabir and Shahnaz Later, she falls for Shahraam. 
 Affan Waheed as Atif:
 He is the first cousin of Arsla from her mother Shahnaz's side. He and Arsla like each other but circumstances let him hate Arsla and he marries Naeema instead.

 Iqra Aziz as Naeema:
 She is the greedy sister of Arsla and wants to become like Arsla. She is a selfish woman who goes to any length to get what she wants. She loves Atif and is angry on Arsla and Atif's engagement. She tries to divide them but fails every time. Her desire is completed by her father as he catches both and lets them both marry each other. 
 Bilal Khan as Shahraam:
 A simple guy who comes from Episode # 9 as the nephew of aunt Nasreen and cousin of Zubyia. He is madly in love with Arsala.
 Tauqeer Nasir as Sabir:
 He is the miserly father of Naeema, Arsla and Guddu. He works in an ordinary factory and leaves the factory on the working of Arsla. He takes advantage of Arsla's money and lets her fiancée be married to Naeema.But on the wedding day, he became good.
 Nida Mumtaz as Shahnaz:
 She is the mother of Arsla, Naeema and Guddu and unlike others, is a supportive mother. She loves Arsla more than other of her children which leads to Naeema's jealousy. She is the wife of Sabir, younger sister of Suraiya and aunt of Atif.
 Sajida Syed as Suraiya:

 She is the mother of Atif, aunt of Naeema, Arsla and Guddu and elder sister of Shahnaz. She is the supporting mother of Atif and wants Atif and Arsala to marry but she is forced to marry Atif with Naeema.
 Javaid Iqbal as Muddassir:

 Sabir's wealthy friend in whose house, he sent Arsala to work as a maid
 Ambar Wajid as Haseena:

 She is the bitter as well as loving wife of Muddassir. She teases Arsala firstly but she then starts managing with her somehow. 
 Fazal Husain as Guddu:

 He is the brother of Naeema and Arsala. He supports Arsala because she always helps him in many things. He hates Naeema due to her hateness with Arsala. 
 Rashida Tabadsum as Safya; 
 Haseena's friend at whose house Haseena sends Arsala for work before moving to Canada
 Saife Hasan as Jamal; Safiya's husband
 Azra Mansoor as Bi Jaan
 Zahra Shah as Zubiya
 Mariam Mirza as Nasreen: Zubiya's mother
 Mohsin Geelani as Basit: Zubiya's father

Production
Zara makes her second appearance on Hum TV after her 2016 romantic drama, Dharkan and return of Iqra Aziz after 3 months on Natak. Apart from acting, Bilal has also sung the OST of the drama.

Awards and nominations

References

External links 
 
 

Hum TV original programming
2010s romantic drama television series
2017 Pakistani television series debuts
Pakistani drama television series
Urdu-language television shows
Hum TV